Love Me Tender may refer to:

Elvis Presley media
"Love Me Tender" (song), a 1956 song by Elvis Presley, adapted from the tune of the 1861 American Civil War song "Aura Lee"
Love Me Tender (film), a 1956 film featuring Elvis Presley, named after the song 
 Love Me Tender (EP), an EP by Elvis Presley, containing songs from the above-mentioned 1956 film Love Me Tender

Music
Love Me Tender (Barb Jungr album), 2005
Love Me Tender (Christer Sjögren album), 2005
Love Me Tender (B.B. King album), 1982
Love Me Tender, a 1987 album by Nana Mouskouri

Television 
"Love Me Tender", an episode of the situation comedy series The Golden Girls
”Love Me Tender”, an episode of the 20th series of the UK/US children’s tv series Thomas & Friends